The 1998 European Community Championships was a men's tennis tournament played on indoor hard courts in Antwerp, Belgium, that was part of the Championship Series of the 1998 ATP Tour. It was the sixteenth edition of the tournament and was held from 16 February to 22 February 1998. Fifth-seeded Greg Rusedski won the singles title.

Champions

Singles

  Greg Rusedski defeated  Marc Rosset, 7–6(7–3), 3–6, 6–1, 6–4

Doubles

  Wayne Ferreira /  Yevgeny Kafelnikov defeated  Tomás Carbonell /  Francisco Roig, 7–5, 3–6, 6–2

References

European Community Championships
ECC Antwerp